Hyainailouridae ("hyena-cats") is a paraphyletic family of extinct predatory mammals from extinct paraphyletic superfamily Hyainailouroidea within extinct order Hyaenodonta. Hyaenodontids arose during the middle Eocene and persisted well into the middle Miocene. Fossils of this group have been found in Asia, Africa, North America and Europe.

General characteristics
Hyainailourids are characterized by long skulls, slender jaws, slim bodies, and a plantigrade stance. They generally ranged in size from 30 to 140 cm at the shoulder. While some measured as much as 1.4 m high at the shoulder with head-body length up to 3.2 m and weighed up to 1,500 kg, most were in the 5–15 kg range, equivalent to a mid-sized dog. The anatomy of their skulls show that they had a particularly acute sense of smell, while their teeth were adapted for shearing, rather than crushing.

At least one hyainailourid lineage, Apterodontinae, was specialised for aquatic, otter-like habits.

Range
They were important hypercarnivores in Eurasia and Africa during the Oligocene, but gradually declined, with almost the entire family becoming extinct by the close of the Oligocene. Only Megistotherium and several of its sister genera, including Hyainailouros and Sivapterodon, survived into the Miocene. Traditionally this has been attributed to competition with carnivorans, but no formal examination of the correlation between the decline of hyaenodontids and the expansion of carnivorans has been recorded, and the latter may simply have moved into vacant niches after the extinction of hyaenodontid species.

Classification and phylogeny

Relations
Hyainailouridae used to be considered a subfamily of Hyaenodontidae, but cladistic study by Sole et al., (2013, 2015) treats it as a distinct family. Two subfamilies are recognized, Apterodontinae and paraphyletic Hyainailourinae.

Taxonomy
 Family: †Hyainailouridae (paraphyletic family) 
 Subfamily: †Apterodontinae 
 Genus: †Apterodon 
 †Apterodon altidens 
 †Apterodon gaudryi 
 †Apterodon langebadreae 
 †Apterodon macrognathus 
 †Apterodon rauenbergensis 
 †Apterodon saghensis 
 †Apterodon sp. [Dur At-Talah escarpment, Libya] 
 Genus: †Quasiapterodon 
 †Quasiapterodon minutus 
 Subfamily: †Hyainailourinae (paraphyletic subfamily) 
 Genus: †Megistotherium 
 †Megistotherium osteothlastes 
 Genus: †Mlanyama 
 †Mlanyama sugu 
 Genus: †Orienspterodon 
 †Orienspterodon dahkoensis 
 Genus: †Pakakali 
 †Pakakali rukwaensis 
 Genus: †Simbakubwa 
 †Simbakubwa kutokaafrika 
 (unranked): †Akhnatenavus clade
 Genus: †Akhnatenavus 
 †Akhnatenavus leptognathus 
 †Akhnatenavus nefertiticyon 
 Genus: †Hemipsalodon 
 †Hemipsalodon grandis 
 †Hemipsalodon viejaensis 
 Genus: †Ischnognathus 
 †Ischnognathus savagei 
 Tribe: †Hyainailourini (polyphyletic tribe) 
 Genus: †Exiguodon 
 †Exiguodon pilgrimi 
 Genus: †Falcatodon 
 †Falcatodon schlosseri 
 Genus: †Hyainailouros (polyphyletic genus) 
 †Hyainailouros bugtiensis 
 †Hyainailouros napakensis 
 †Hyainailouros sulzeri 
 Genus: †Parapterodon 
 †Parapterodon lostangensis 
 Genus: †Sectisodon 
 †Sectisodon markgrafi 
 †Sectisodon occultus 
 Genus: †Sivapterodon 
 †Sivapterodon lahirii 
 Subtribe: †Isohyaenodontina (polyphyletic subtribe) 
 Genus: †Isohyaenodon (polyphyletic genus) 
 †Isohyaenodon andrewsi 
 †Isohyaenodon zadoki 
 (unranked): †Pterodon clade
 Genus: †Kerberos 
 †Kerberos langebadreae 
 Subtribe: †Pterodontina 
 Genus: †Pterodon 
 †Pterodon dasyuroides 
 Incertae sedis:
 †"Pterodon" syrtos 
 Incertae sedis:
 †"Pterodon" africanus 
 †"Pterodon" phiomensis 
 †"Pterodon" sp. [DPC 5036] 
 Tribe: †Leakitheriini 
 Genus: †Leakitherium 
 †Leakitherium hiwegi 
 Tribe: †Metapterodontini 
 Genus: †Metapterodon 
 †Metapterodon brachycephalus 
 †Metapterodon kaiseri 
 †Metapterodon stromeri 
 Tribe: †Paroxyaenini 
 Genus: †Paroxyaena 
 †Paroxyaena galliae 
 †Paroxyaena pavlovi 
 Incertae sedis:
 †"Pterodon" sp. [BC 15’08] 
 †Hyainailourinae sp. [GSN AD 100’96] 
 †Hyainailourinae sp. [UON 84-359] 
 †Hyainailourinae sp. A [DPC 6555] 
 †Hyainailourinae sp. C [DPC 9243 & DPC 10315] 
 †Hyainailourinae sp. D [DPC 6545]

Phylogeny
The phylogenetic relationships of family Hyainailouridae are shown in the following cladogram:

See also
 Mammal classification
 Hyainailouroidea

References

Hyaenodonts
Eocene mammals
Oligocene mammals
Miocene mammals
Prehistoric mammal families